Höfuðlausnir was an album released in May 1988 by Icelandic rock singer Megas. This album was released through Gramm and featured singers Björk and Rose McDowall as background vocalists. Höfuðlausnir also includes Megas’ long-time collaborator Guðlaugur Kristinn Óttarsson who adding guitars to this work.

Track listing

External links
Page about Megas at Tónlist.com - It features discography with mp3 samples.
Official site of Guðlaugur Kristinn Óttarsson
Page of G. K. Óttarsson at MySpace.com

1988 albums
Megas albums